Matt Hume (born July 14, 1966) is an American mixed martial arts trainer and businessman. He is the founder and head trainer at AMC Pankration in Kirkland, WA, home to former UFC flyweight champion Demetrious Johnson and ONE bantamweight champion Bibiano Fernandes. Hume has trained numerous world class fighters including Josh Barnett, Tim Boetsch, Bob Sapp, Chris Leben, Hayato Sakurai, Akira Shoji, Matt Brown, Rich Franklin, Mario Miranda and Caros Fodor. Hume has been the Senior Vice President of Competition for Singapore-based combat sports promotion ONE Championship since 2012.

Early life
Hume grew up in Kirkland, Washington. His father was a Seattle police officer and his mother was a housewife and later a nurse. He graduated from Lake Washington High School, later receiving his college degree in business from Central Washington University. Matt trained and competed in collegiate style wrestling, boxing, judo, and karate as a child. After graduating from CWU, Matt competed in WKA Kickboxing, winning the North American Super Welterweight Title. Hume went on to compete in the Japanese organization Pancrase.  He has also competed at Battlecade Extreme Fighting, The Contenders, and AFC, as well as the very first ADCC submission wrestling tournament.

Mixed martial arts career

Matt Hume first competed in the Shootfighting-style MMA organization Pancrase, debuting at Pancrash 3! against Katsuomi Inagaki, a fight where he lost by points. He would win his second MMA fight against Pancrase veteran and future UFC-fighter Scott Bessac via Rear Naked Choke, but go to lose his next 3 fights, against Ken Shamrock, Manabu Yamada and Jason Delucia. He would then gain a swift victory over Scott Sollivan with an armbar in under a minute, but would later lose by points against Minoru Suzuki in his final Pancrase fight. He has a record of 2 wins and 5 losses in Pancrase.

Outside of Pancrase, Matt Hume holds wins over former Shooto champion Erik Paulson and former UFC Welterweight Champion Pat Miletich. Matt Hume also defeated former Olympic gold medalist Kenny Monday by a Toe hold submission in only 45 seconds in the main event of the pay-per-view world submission wrestling championships "The Contenders".

Matt Hume's submission grappling impressed Prince Sheik Tahnoun Bin Zayed Al Nayhan of Abu Dhabi in the United Arab Emirates so much, that the Prince requested that Matt come to Abu Dhabi to personally train him and his combat team. Shortly after Matt trained him and his team, the prince was inspired to start the now famous ADCC Submission Wrestling World Championship. Matt participated in the inaugural event, winning all of his matches, but withdrawing after his semifinal victory on the doctor's recommendation after a ruptured anterior cruciate ligament injury.

Hume's last fight was a win against Shawn Peters by armbar, at Hook n Shoot Absolute Fighting Championships 1, December 13, 2002.

Executive positions
Hume was the rule director and official trainer to both PRIDE Fighting Championships and Dream.

Hume was initially appointed as the head official by Singapore-based promotion ONE Championship when it was founded in 2011. The following year he accepted a new role as Vice President of Operations.

Mixed martial arts record

|-
|Win
|align=center| 5–5
|Shawn Peters
|Submission (armbar)
|HOOKnSHOOT: Absolute FC 1
|
|align=center|1
|align=center|1:45
|Fort Lauderdale, Florida, United States
|
|-
|Win
|align=center| 4–5
|Pat Miletich
|TKO (nose injury)
|Extreme Fighting 4
|
|align=center|1
|align=center|5:00
|Des Moines, Iowa, United States
|
|-
|Win
|align=center| 3–5
|Erik Paulson
|TKO (doctor stoppage)
|Extreme Fighting 3
|
|align=center|3
|align=center|0:44
|Tulsa, Oklahoma, United States
|
|-
|Loss
|align=center| 2–5
|Minoru Suzuki
|Decision (lost points)
|Pancrase - King of Pancrase Tournament 
|
|align=center|1
|align=center|10:00
|Tokyo, Japan
|
|-
|Win
|align=center| 2–4
|Scott Sollivan
|Submission (armbar)
|Pancrase - Road To The Championship 5
|
|align=center|1
|align=center|0:38
|Tokyo, Japan
|
|-
|Loss
|align=center| 1–4
|Jason DeLucia
|Decision (lost points)
|Pancrase - Road To The Championship 4
|
|align=center|1
|align=center|15:00
|Osaka, Japan
|
|-
|Loss
|align=center| 1–3
|Manabu Yamada
|Submission (heel hook)
|Pancrase - Road To The Championship 3
|
|align=center|1
|align=center|2:31
|Osaka, Japan
|
|-
|Loss
|align=center| 1–2
|Ken Shamrock
|Submission (kimura)
|Pancrase - Road To The Championship 2
|
|align=center|1
|align=center|5:50
|Hyogo, Japan
|
|-
|Win
|align=center| 1–1
|Scott Bessac
|Submission (rear-naked choke)
|Pancrase - Road To The Championship 1
|
|align=center|1
|align=center|1:21
|Tokyo, Japan
|
|-
|Loss
|align=center| 0–1
|Katsuomi Inagaki
|Decision (lost points)
|Pancrase - Pancrash! 3
|
|align=center|1
|align=center|10:00
|Tokyo, Japan
|
|-

Submission grappling record
KO PUNCHES
|- style="text-align:center; background:#f0f0f0;"
| style="border-style:none none solid solid; "|Result
| style="border-style:none none solid solid; "|Opponent
| style="border-style:none none solid solid; "|Method
| style="border-style:none none solid solid; "|Event
| style="border-style:none none solid solid; "|Date
| style="border-style:none none solid solid; "|Round
| style="border-style:none none solid solid; "|Time
| style="border-style:none none solid solid; "|Notes
|-
|Win|| Luis Brito || Points || ADCC -77 kg|| 1998|| 1|| 10:00||
|-
|Win|| Micah Pittman || Submission || ADCC -77 kg|| 1998|| 1|| 5:34||
|-
|Win|| Kenny Monday || Submission (toe hold) || The Contenders|| 1997|| 1|| 0:45||
|-

References

External links

1966 births
Living people
American male mixed martial artists
Mixed martial artists utilizing pankration
Mixed martial artists utilizing collegiate wrestling
Mixed martial artists utilizing Muay Thai
Mixed martial artists utilizing wushu
Mixed martial artists utilizing Shitō-ryū
Mixed martial artists utilizing boxing
Mixed martial artists utilizing Brazilian jiu-jitsu
Mixed martial arts trainers
American wushu practitioners
American practitioners of Brazilian jiu-jitsu
People awarded a black belt in Brazilian jiu-jitsu
American male sport wrestlers
Amateur wrestlers
American male karateka
American Muay Thai practitioners
ONE Championship